Robbins is a station on Metra's Rock Island District line located in Robbins, Illinois. Robbins is located at 139th and Utica. In Metra's zone-based fare structure, Robbins is located in zone D. As of 2018, Robbins is the 203rd busiest of Metra's 236 non-downtown stations, with an average of 65 weekday boardings. Robbins consists of two side platforms which serve two tracks. The station has a small station house on the inbound track, but there is no ticket agent. Parking is available in an adjacent lot.

As of 2022, Robbins is served as a flag stop by 21 trains in each direction on weekdays, by 10 inbound trains and 11 outbound trains on Saturdays, and by eight trains in each direction on Sundays.

Tracks
There are two tracks at Robbins. Trains from Chicago run on track 2 (the north track) and trains to Chicago run on track 1 (the south track.)

Bus connections
Pace
 359 Robbins/South Kedzie Avenue

References

External links

Station from 139th Street from Google Maps Street View

Metra stations in Illinois
Robbins, Illinois
Former Chicago, Rock Island and Pacific Railroad stations
Railway stations in Cook County, Illinois